The 2013–14 Pacific Tigers women's basketball team represented the University of the Pacific during the 2013–14 NCAA Division I women's basketball season. The Tigers had a season of new beginnings as they joined a new conference- the West Coast Conference. Pacific was one of the founders of what became the WCC. After four decades the Tigers returned, allowing the WCC to return to a travel partner scenario. Pacific and Saint Mary's became travel partners. The other 4 sets of travel partners were San Francsico and Santa Clara, Loyola Marymount and Pepperdine, Gonzaga and Portland, and BYU and San Diego. The Tigers were led by eighth year head coach Lynne Roberts and played their home games in the Alex G. Spanos Center. The Tigers would finish the season 18–13, placing third in the WCC, and participate in their third consecutive WNIT Tournament.

Roster

Schedule
Source:

|-
!colspan=8 style="background:#FF7F00; color:#000000;"|Exhibition

|-
!colspan=8 style="background:#000000; color:#FF7F00;"| Regular Season

|-
!colspan=8 style="background:#FF7F00;"| 2014 WCC Tournament

|-
!colspan=8 style="background:#000000;"| 2014 WNIT

Game Summaries

Exhibition: Cal State East Bay

Cal State Stanislaus

UC Davis

Iona

Fordham

Arizona

Notre Dame de Namur

California

Hawaiʻi

Florida State

Richmond

Portland
Series History: Portland leads 6-2

Gonzaga
Series History: Pacific leads 2-1

BYU
Series History: BYU leads series 5-1
Broadcasters: Spencer Linton, Jarom Jordan, and Andy Boyce

San Diego
Series History: San Diego leads 10-2

San Francisco
Series History: San Francisco leads 15-12

Santa Clara
Series History: Santa Clara leads 25-16

Loyola Marymount
Series History: Pacific leads series 1-0
Broadcasters: Don Gubbins and Alex Sanchez

Pepperdine
Series History: Pepperdine leads 3-0
Broadcasters: Don Gubbins and Alex Sanchez

Saint Mary's
Series History: Saint Mary's leads 13-6
Broadcasters: Don Gubbins

San Diego
Series History: San Diego leads 11-2
Broadcasters: Don Gubbins

BYU
Series History: BYU leads 5-2
Broadcaster: Don Gubbins

Saint Mary's
Series History: Saint Mary's leads 13-7
Broadcasters: George Devine and Mary Hile-Nepfel

Pepperdine
Series History: Pepperdine leads 3-1
Broadcasters: Josh Perigo

Loyola Marymount
Series History: Pacific leads series 2-0

Santa Clara
Series History: Santa Clara leads 25-17
Broadcaster: Don Gubbins

San Francisco
Series History: San Francisco leads 15-13
Broadcaster: Don Gubbins

Portland
Series History: Portland leads 7-2

Gonzaga
Series History: Series even 2-2

Rankings

References

Pacific Tigers women's basketball seasons
Pacific